Persicula accola, common names twinned margin shell, twinned marginella, twinned marginsnail, is a species of sea snail, a marine gastropod mollusk, in the family Cystiscidae.

References

accola
Gastropods described in 1968
Cystiscidae